African tree pangolin (Phataginus) is a genus of African pangolins from subfamily small African pangolins (Phatagininae), within family Manidae. Its members are the more arboreal of the African pangolins.

The number of illegally trafficked pangolins from genus Phataginus were at least a shocking 895,000 from the years 2010 to 2019. The animal is hunted and poached for its scales and meat and is often used for the making of traditional medicine in places such as China and Vietnam. Attempts are still being made to help protect these mammals from trafficking and extinction, unfortunately their slow reproduction rate isn't much of assistance to this effort. Currently the tree pangolin is listed as vulnerable. All of the pangolins species have been listed as vulnerable, endangered and critically endangered.

Etymology
Constantine Rafinesque (1821) formed the Neo-Latin generic name Phataginus from the French term phatagin, adopted by Count Buffon (1763) after the reported local name phatagin or phatagen used in the East Indies.

Taxonomy
 Subfamily: Phatagininae (small African pangolins)
 Genus: Phataginus (African tree pangolin)
 Phataginus tetradactyla (Long-tailed pangolin)
 Phataginus tricuspis (Tree pangolin)

Phylogeny
Phylogenetic position of genus Phataginus within family Manidae.

References

 
Mammal genera
 
 
 
Taxa named by Constantine Samuel Rafinesque